The local elections were held in the Federation of Malaya in 1953.

Municipal election

George Town

Kuala Lumpur

Malacca

Town councils election

Alor Star

Bandar Maharani, Muar

Bandar Penggaram, Batu Pahat

Johore Bahru

Kluang

Kota Bharu

Kuala Trengganu

Segamat

Seremban

Sungei Patani

Local councils election

Guntong
Guntong local election was the second election to be held in the Kinta district. Guntong was divided into four wards with an electorate of 4,000.

Kota Tinggi

Kuala Ketil

Kulai

Trengganu
Local council elections for 17 kampongs in five mukims in Trengganu were held in January 1953. The mukims are Pantai, Chalok, Guntong, Tasek and Ulu Situ.

References

1953
1953 elections in Malaya
1953 elections in Asia